The 2021–22 season was Al-Shorta's 48th season in the Iraqi Premier League, having featured in all 47 previous editions of the competition. Al-Shorta participated in the Iraqi Premier League and the Iraq FA Cup, having finished fourth in the league in the 2020–21 season.

Under the management of Egyptian coach Moamen Soliman, Al-Shorta enjoyed one of the best league seasons in their history. Al-Shorta set a record for the earliest league title win in Iraq with seven rounds of the competition remaining, clinching the title with a 2–0 win over runners-up Al-Quwa Al-Jawiya. Al-Shorta also became the first club to beat all other teams in a 20-team season and the first club to win all Baghdad derbies home and away in one season.

Their tally of 91 points equalled the record set by Al-Talaba in 2001–02 for most points in a 38-game season, and they set a record for the largest title-winning margin by finishing 21 points clear at the top of the table. In the Iraq FA Cup, Al-Shorta were eliminated in the Round of 16 against Erbil on penalties.

Squad
Numbers in parenthesis denote appearances as substitute.

Personnel

Technical staff

Management

Kit
Supplier: Qithara (club's own brand)

Transfers

In

Out

Competitions

Iraqi Premier League

Score overview

Note: Al-Shorta goals listed first.

Classification

Results summary

Results by round

Iraq FA Cup

Player statistics

Iraqi Premier League

Iraq FA Cup

References

External links
Al-Shorta SC Official Website

Al-Shorta SC seasons